Faizan Khan (born 27 August 1992) is a Pakistani cricketer who plays for Sui Southern Gas Company. He made his first-class debut on 30 November 2015 in the 2015–16 Quaid-e-Azam Trophy. He made his Twenty20 debut for the Lahore Qalandars in the 2018 Abu Dhabi T20 Trophy on 4 October 2018.

References

External links
 

1992 births
Living people
Pakistani cricketers
Lahore Qalandars cricketers
Sui Southern Gas Company cricketers
Cricketers from Karachi